The Dark Side of the Heart is a 1992 Argentine surrealist romantic drama film written and directed by Eliseo Subiela. The film was selected as the Argentine entry for the Best Foreign Language Film at the 65th Academy Awards, but was not accepted as a nominee. It is currently considered a cult film.

Plot 

Oliverio (Grandinetti), a Bohemian poet, travels through Buenos Aires with his friends, harassed by Death, looking for a woman capable of “flying”. In the course of the film, the poetry of Mario Benedetti, Juan Gelman and Oliverio Girondo is seen intermingled with the thickest places of Argentine and Uruguayan artistic daily life. From the barbecue, to the battered bars of Buenos Aires and Montevideo, the main character's thought is intermittently intertwined with fiction, only to be able to better show the central character's thinking.

The story unfolds in the comings and goings of Oliverio, through his world, in which, exchanging food for poetry, or asking for coins on street corners, seeing Mario Benedetti reciting his poems in German, seeing Genetic sculptures, talking to cows, and conversing with death seem to be part of any given day in the life of a poet.

Cast
 Darío Grandinetti as Oliverio
 Sandra Ballesteros as Ana
 Nacha Guevara as Death
 André Melançon as Erik
 Jean Pierre Reguerraz as Gustavo
 Mónica Galán as the ex-wife
 Inés Vernengo: the blind girl

Awards 
Montreal World Film Festival

 Grand Prix des Amériques

Biarritz Film Festival

 Best Actor
 Best Actress

Huelva Ibero-American Film Festival

 Critic Award

Havana Film Festival

 Best Actor

Argentine Academy of Cinematography Arts and Sciences Awards

 Best Director
 Best Cinematography
 Best Art Direction
 Best Editing

43rd Berlin International Film Festival

 Jury Award of the Readers of the Berliner Zeitung newspaper, International Forum of Young Cinema

Cartagena Film Festival

 Best Director
 Best Cinematography
 Critics Jury Award

Cinoche International Film Festival of Baie-Comeau

 Best Screenplay

Festival du film de Sept-Îles

 Best Film

Silver Condor, Argentine Film Critics Association

 Best Director
 Best Cinematography
 Best Art Direction
 Best Female Revelation

Bergamo Film Meeting

 “Rosa Camuna” Award for Best Film

Sin Cortes Awards

 Best film
 Best Screenplay
 Best Art Direction
 Best Original Music Score
 Best Female Revelation

Argentores Awards

 Best Film Book

Festival de Gramado

 Best Director
 Best Actor
 Best Original Music Score

Sequel 
A sequel titled The Dark Side of the Heart 2 was released in 2001. A Spanish-Argentine co-production, also written and directed by Eliseo Subiela, and starring Darío Grandinetti and Sandra Ballesteros, along with Ariadna Gil and Nacha Guevara. It was released on July 5, 2001.

See also
 List of submissions to the 65th Academy Awards for Best Foreign Language Film
 List of Argentine submissions for the Academy Award for Best Foreign Language Film

References

External links
 
 The Dark Side of the Heart at Cine Nacional

1992 films
1992 romantic drama films
Argentine romantic drama films
1990s Spanish-language films
1990s Argentine films